The men's 110 metres hurdles at the 2015 World Championships in Athletics was held at the Beijing National Stadium on 26, 27 and 28 August.

Summary
The returning champion was David Oliver, while world leader in 2015 Orlando Ortega is ineligible after switching his nationality to Spain (after defecting to the USA at the 2013 Championships).  World record holder Aries Merritt was here, just days before a scheduled kidney transplant.

The heats will be remembered for the false start disqualification of Ronnie Ash.  Similar to Jon Drummond's incident in 2003, Ash refused to accept the disqualification and took several minutes before being convinced to leave the track.

In the finals, Oliver was the first to the first hurdle, and he hit it badly.  Dimitri Bascou was the next to show a microscopic lead which only lasted until he clobbered the third hurdle, giving world #2 Omar McLeod three steps in the lead until he flipped the fourth hurdle.  Merritt and Sergey Shubenkov were the next leaders.  Merritt seemed to be running too close to the hurdles and had to slow to compensate giving Shubenkov a slight edge.  Hansle Parchment built up speed and even though he hit the tenth hurdle, had more speed to the finish.	
His late rush passed Merritt to earn silver and make for a challenge to Shubenkov for the gold.  Shubenkov's 12.98 was a new Russian National Record.

Records
Prior to the competition, the records were as follows:

Qualification standards

Schedule

Results

Heats
Qualification: First 4 in each heat (Q) and the next 4 fastest (q) advanced to the Semifinals. Heats were held on 26 August.

Wind:Heat 1: -1.3 m/s, Heat 2:  +0.2 m/s, Heat 3: -1.0 m/s, Heat 4: -0.7 m/s, Heat 5: -1.2 m/s

Semifinals
Qualification: First 2 in each heat (Q) and the next 2 fastest (q) advanced to the final.

Wind:Heat 1: 0.0 m/s, Heat 2:  -0.2 m/s, Heat 3: -0.1 m/s

Final
The final was held at 21:20.

References

110 metres hurdles
Sprint hurdles at the World Athletics Championships